Bae Eun-hye (born August 21, 1982) was a member of the South Korean judo team and a silver medalist in the 2006 Doha Asian Games for the women's 70 kg judo event.

See also

References

1982 births
Living people
Asian Games medalists in judo
Judoka at the 2002 Asian Games
Judoka at the 2006 Asian Games
Universiade medalists in judo
Asian Games silver medalists for South Korea
Medalists at the 2002 Asian Games
Medalists at the 2006 Asian Games
Universiade bronze medalists for South Korea
21st-century South Korean people